Altaf Hossain Chowdhury is a former chief of Bangladesh Air Force and a Bangladesh Nationalist Party politician. He served as a minister of home affairs and commerce during 2001–2006. He was a Jatiya Sangsad member representing the Patuakhali-1 constituency in the same period.

Career

Military
Chowdhury started his career as a fighter pilot in the Pakistan Air Force, qualifying as a lead pilot in the Dassault Mirage III. In 1971 he was a Flight Lieutenant. He joined the Bangladesh Air Force in 1972 as a Squadron Leader after being released from detention by Pakistan. Between 1974 and 1977 he was instructor at the pilot training school. He was the Chief of Bangladesh Air Force from 1991 to 1995.

Political
After retiring from the military service in 1995 he joined Bangladesh Nationalist Party. He went on to serve as a minister of different ministries and a Jatiya Sangsad member during the BNP administration from 2001 until 2006.

Chowdhury served as the president of Patuakhali district BNP in 2008. He lost both the 2008 and 2018 general elections to the Awami League candidate Shahjahan Mia. As of 2016, Chowdhury has been a Vice chairman of the party.

Charges
Chowdhury was taken into custody of joint forces in May 2007 during the caretaker government regime. The force seized a shotgun and a rifle, 99 bullets, 970 pieces of saree and 160 pieces of lungi of the government relief materials from his Patuakhali residence.

On 18 December 2007, the Anti-Corruption Commission (ACC) filed a case against Chowdhury for concealing wealth information and amassing wealth worth beyond known sources of income. In April 2017, the High Court cleared the way for a lower court to resume the trial proceedings.

On 26 February 2008, ACC filed another case accusing Khaleda Zia and 10 of her former cabinet members, including Chowdhury, of taking bribe in the Barapukuria coalmine deal. In December 2017, the High Court asked Chowdhury to surrender to a lower court within four weeks in this case.

On 11 June 2011, Chowdhury and Hafizuddin Ahmed were arrested and sent to jail in connection with an arson case. They were later freed on bail.

Personal life
Chowdhury is married to Suriya Chowdhury. Chowdhury's two brothers, Babul Chowdhury and Shahin Chowdhury, were accused in an armed robbery case in Mirzaganj Upazila in Patuakhali in 2007.

References

External links

1940s births
Living people
People from Patuakhali district
Chiefs of Air Staff (Bangladesh)
Bangladesh Air Force air marshals
Bangladesh Nationalist Party politicians
8th Jatiya Sangsad members
Home Affairs ministers of Bangladesh
Commerce ministers of Bangladesh
Place of birth missing (living people)